What Lies Beneath is a studio album by Robin Trower.

Track listing

All songs written by Robin Trower.

Personnel
 Robin Trower – guitar, vocals
 Roger Cotton – organ
 Andrew Haveron & Clare Hinton - strings
 Livingston Brown – bass guitar
 Sam Van Essen – drums (tracks 1, 3-7, 10, 11)
 Chris Taggart – drums (tracks 2, 8 & 9)

Album cover
 Front cover art from an original painting by Bruer Tidman
 Graphic design & packaging by EricKrauseGraphics.com

References 
Source – Album liner notes.

External links 
 TrowerPower.com - Official website
 Bruer Tidman - Official website
 Robin Trower - What Lies Beneath (2009) album releases & credits at Discogs
 Robin Trower - What Lies Beneath (2009) album to be listened on Spotify
 Robin Trower - What Lies Beneath (2009) album to be listened on YouTube

2009 albums
Robin Trower albums